reStructuredText (RST, ReST, or reST) is a file format for textual data used primarily in the Python programming language community for technical documentation.

It is part of the Docutils project of the Python Doc-SIG (Documentation Special Interest Group), aimed at creating a set of tools for Python similar to Javadoc for Java or Plain Old Documentation (POD) for Perl. Docutils can extract comments and information from Python programs, and format them into various forms of program documentation.

In this sense, reStructuredText is a lightweight markup language designed to be both (a) processable by documentation-processing software such as Docutils, and (b) easily readable by human programmers who are reading and writing Python source code.

History 
reStructuredText evolved from an earlier lightweight markup language called StructuredText (developed by Zope). There were a number of problems with StructuredText, and reST was developed to address them.
The name reStructuredText was chosen to indicate that reST is a "revised, reworked, and reinterpreted StructuredText."

Parts of the reST syntax were inspired by the Setext language from the early 1990s. Elements of the common RFC822 Internet Message Format and Javadoc formats were also considered for inclusion in the design.

reStructuredText was first released in June 2001. It began to see significant use in the Python community in 2002.

Reference implementation 
The reference implementation of the reST parser is a component of the Docutils text processing framework in the Python programming language, but other parsers are available.

There is no official MIME type registered for reStructuredText, but the unofficial one is text/x-rst.

Applications
reStructuredText is commonly used for technical documentation, for example, in documentation of Python libraries. However, it is suitable for a wide range of texts.

Since 2008, reST has been a core component of Python's Sphinx document generation system.

Trac also supports reStructuredText, as do GitHub and Bitbucket.

In 2011, Distributed Proofreaders, which prepared texts for Project Gutenberg, was considering adoption of reST as a basic format from which other ebook formats could be generated.

In July 2016 the Linux kernel project decided to transition from DocBook based documentation to reStructuredText and the Sphinx toolchain.

The software build tool CMake switched from a custom markup language to reStructuredText in version 3.0 for its documentation.

Examples

See also 
 Comparison of document-markup languages
 Comparison of documentation generators
 Comparison of note-taking software

References

External links 
 Official reStructuredText website with reference pages

Lightweight markup languages